Pseudocodium is a genus of green algae in the family Pseudocodiaceae.

References

Ulvophyceae genera
Bryopsidales